Castilleja subinclusa is a species of Indian paintbrush known by the common names longleaf Indian paintbrush and Franciscan paint brush.

It is native to California and Baja California, where it grows in a number of habitat types including chaparral.

Description
Castilleja subinclusa is a spreading perennial herb which can exceed a meter tall. It is gray-green to purple in herbage color, and usually hairy. The lance-shaped leaves are up to 8 centimeters long.

The inflorescence is up to 40 centimeters long and is made up of long, pointed bracts tipped in bright red-orange to deep red. Between the colorful bracts appear lighter flowers, which are yellow-green to pinkish and hairy.

Subspecies
Subspecies, which generally do not occur together, include:
Castilleja subinclusa ssp. franciscana — Franciscan paintbrush — endemic to the coastline surrounding the San Francisco Bay Area.
Castilleja subinclusa ssp. subinclusa  — long leaf paintbrush,  longleaf Indian paintbrush — in the Transverse Ranges, Inner South California Coast Ranges, Peninsular Ranges, and Southern Sierra Nevada.

References

External links

Calflora: Castilleja subinclusa (Franciscan Paint Brush,  longleaf Indian paintbrush)
Jepson Manual Treatment
Photo gallery

subinclusa
Flora of California
Flora of Baja California
Flora of the Sierra Nevada (United States)
Natural history of the California chaparral and woodlands
Natural history of the California Coast Ranges
Natural history of the Peninsular Ranges
Natural history of the San Francisco Bay Area
Natural history of the Transverse Ranges
Plants described in 1899